Austria competed at the 2020 Summer Olympics in Tokyo. Originally scheduled to take place from 24 July to 9 August 2020, the Olympic Games were postponed to 23 July to 8 August 2021, because of the COVID-19 pandemic. It was the nation's twenty-eighth appearance at the Summer Olympics.

Austria won seven medals, a significant improvement on their 2016 result, when the country won only a single bronze medal. In women's road race, Anna Kiesenhofer won Austria's first gold medal at the Summer Olympics since 2004.

Medalists

Competitors
The following is the list of number of competitors from the Austrian delegation participating in the Games:

Artistic swimming

Austria fielded a squad of two artistic swimmers to compete in the women's duet event, who qualified by winning the gold medal at the 2021 FINA Olympic Qualification Tournament in Barcelona, Spain.

Athletics

Track & road events

Field events

Combined events – Women's heptathlon

Badminton

Austria entered one badminton player into the Olympic tournament. Luka Wraber secured the men's singles spot at the Games based on the BWF Race to Tokyo Rankings.

Canoeing

Slalom
Austrian canoeists qualified one boat for each of the following classes through the 2019 ICF Canoe Slalom World Championships in La Seu d'Urgell, Spain.

Cycling

Road
Austria sent a delegation of four riders (three men and one woman) to compete in their respective Olympic road races, by virtue of their top 50 national finish (for men) and her top 100 individual finish (for women) in the UCI World Ranking.

Track
Following the completion of the 2020 UCI Track Cycling World Championships, Austrian riders accumulated spots in the men's omnium and madison based on their country's results in the final UCI Olympic rankings.

Omnium

Madison

Mountain biking
Austrian mountain bikers qualified for one men's and one women's quota place each into the Olympic cross-country race, as a result of the nation's ninth-place-finish for men and fifteenth for women, respectively, in the UCI Olympic Ranking List of 16 May 2021.

Equestrian

Austria entered one eventing rider into the Olympic equestrian competition by securing the last of six available slots, outside the group and continental selection, in the individual FEI Olympic rankings. Meanwhile, a composite squad of three dressage riders was formed and thereby added to the Austrian roster by receiving a spare berth freed up by one of two nations, unable to fulfill the NOC Certificate of Capability, based on their individual results in the FEI Olympic rankings at the end of 2019 season. With Pakistan failing to comply with the minimum eligibility requirements, Austria received an invitation from FEI to send an additional eventing rider to the Games, as the next highest-ranked eligible nation outside of the group and continental selection.

Dressage
The Austrian dressage team was named on June 11, 2021. The team is led by four-time Olympian Victoria Max-Theurer, who is joined by Florian Bacher and Christian Schumach.

Qualification Legend: Q = Qualified for the final; q = Qualified for the final as a lucky loser

Eventing
Katrin Khoddam-Hazrati was forced to withdraw from the Games when her horse Cosma threw a shoe before competing in the dressage.

Golf

Austria entered two male golfers and one female golfer into the Olympic tournament. Bernd Wiesberger qualified but chose not to play.

Gymnastics

Artistic
Austria entered one artistic gymnast into the Olympic competition. Elisa Hämmerle booked a spot in the women's individual all-around and apparatus events, by finishing eleventh out of the twenty gymnasts eligible for qualification at the 2019 World Championships in Stuttgart, Germany.

Judo
 
Austria entered six judoka (two men and four women) into the Olympic tournament based on the International Judo Federation Olympics Individual Ranking.

Karate
 
Austria entered one karateka into the inaugural Olympic tournament. Bettina Plank competed in the women's kumite 55 kg, qualifying via World Karate Federation continental representation quotas.

Modern pentathlon

Rowing

Austria qualified one boat in the women's single sculls for the Games by finishing third in the B-final and securing the last of nine berths available at the 2019 FISA World Championships in Ottensheim, Austria. Meanwhile, the women's lightweight double sculls crew added one boat for the Austrian roster with a third-place finish at the 2021 European Continental Qualification Regatta in Varese, Italy.

Qualification Legend: FA=Final A (medal); FB=Final B (non-medal); FC=Final C (non-medal); FD=Final D (non-medal); FE=Final E (non-medal); FF=Final F (non-medal); SA/B=Semifinals A/B; SC/D=Semifinals C/D; SE/F=Semifinals E/F; QF=Quarterfinals; R=Repechage

Sailing

Austrian sailors qualified one boat in each of the following classes through the 2018 Sailing World Championships, the class-associated Worlds, and the continental regattas.

On March 6, 2020, the Austrian Olympic Committee announced the first set of sailors to compete at the Enoshima regatta, namely Rio 2016 bronze medalist Tanja Frank and her new partner Lorena Abicht in the women's 49erFX class.

M = Medal race; EL = Eliminated – did not advance into the medal race

Shooting

Austrian shooters achieved quota places for the following events by virtue of their best finishes at the 2018 ISSF World Championships, the 2019 ISSF World Cup series, European Championships or Games, and European Qualifying Tournament, as long as they obtained a minimum qualifying score (MQS) by 31 May 2020.

Skateboarding

Austria entered one skateboarder into the Olympic tournament

Sport climbing

Austria entered two sport climbers into the Olympic tournament. Jakob Schubert and Jessica Pilz qualified directly each for the men's and women's combined event, by advancing to the final stage and securing one of the seven provisional berths at the 2019 IFSC World Championships in Hachioji, Japan.

Swimming

Austrian swimmers further achieved qualifying standards in the following events (up to a maximum of 2 swimmers in each event at the Olympic Qualifying Time (OQT), and potentially 1 at the Olympic Selection Time (OST)):

Men

Women

Table tennis

Austria entered five athletes into the table tennis competition at the Games. The women's team secured a berth by advancing to the quarterfinal round of the 2020 World Olympic Qualification Event in Gondomar, Portugal, permitting a maximum of two starters to compete in the women's singles tournament. Moreover, an additional place was awarded to the Austrian table tennis players competing in the inaugural mixed doubles by virtue of a top six national finish vying for qualification in the ITTF Olympic Rankings.

Two-time Olympian Robert Gardos and Daniel Habesohn were automatically selected among the top seven eligible players in the men's singles based on the ITTF Olympic Rankings of June 1, 2021.

Tennis

Triathlon

Individual

Weightlifting

Austrian weightlifters qualified for two quota places at the games, based on the Tokyo 2020 Rankings Qualification List of 11 June 2021.

See also
 Austria at the 2020 Summer Paralympics

References

Nations at the 2020 Summer Olympics
2020
2021 in Austrian sport